East Langdon is a village in the Dover district of Kent, England, and  northeast from Dover town. The population is included in the civil parish of Langdon

East Langdon was mentioned in the Domesday Book. The word 'Langdon' is "long hill" in Old English.

The church is dedicated to Saint Augustine. The remains of Langdon Abbey are nearby.

External links

Villages in Kent